Günther Bartnick (born 20 February 1949) is a retired East German biathlete. He won a bronze medal in relay at the Biathlon World Championships 1973 and a silver medal in the first World Championship 10 km sprint for men in 1974. He started for the SG Dynamo Zinnwald / Sportvereinigung (SV) Dynamo.

References 

1949 births
Living people
German male biathletes
Olympic biathletes of East Germany
Biathletes at the 1972 Winter Olympics
Biathlon World Championships medalists